Dorothy Morlan (May 25, 1882 – October 25, 1967) was an American Impressionist artist from Salem, Ohio.

Biography
Dorothy Morlan's father was an amateur painter, and taught Morlan how to paint at an early age. Morlan moved to Irvington, a suburb of Indianapolis, Indiana at a young age, and that is where the majority of her career as an artist took place. Morlan studied at the Herron School of Art and Design and was a known participant in the Indianapolis City Hospital Project.

Career
Dorothy Morlan began her career as a student at the John Herron Art Institute, where she began studying composition in 1905. She studied under J. Ottis Adams, and William Forsyth, and began to study landscape painting while at Herron. After studying at Herron, Morlan studied at the Robert Henri School of Art in New York and at the Pennsylvania Academy of the Fine Arts, under Daniel Garber.
Shortly after her return to Indianapolis, she began the Indianapolis City Hospital Project under the direction of William Forsyth. Morlan was a confirmed participant in the project, although her murals did not survive multiple hospital renovations. Morlan was also a member of the Irvington Group, a group of artists that lived and taught in the Indianapolis suburb of Irvington.

Morlan suffered a stroke in the late 1940s which paralyzed her right side, ending her painting career; she remained an invalid until her death. She died in Indianapolis.

References

American Impressionist painters
American landscape painters
19th-century American painters
Hoosier Group landscape painters
Irvington Group landscape painters
Painters from Ohio
20th-century American painters
American women painters
19th-century American women artists
20th-century American women artists
Artists from Indianapolis
Painters from Indiana
1882 births
1967 deaths
Pennsylvania Academy of the Fine Arts alumni
Herron School of Art and Design alumni
American muralists
Women muralists